Morgan Brody is a fictional character on the CBS crime drama CSI: Crime Scene Investigation, portrayed by Elisabeth Harnois. The character made her series debut during the season eleven episode "Cello and Goodbye", and departed the franchise in "Immortality", CSI series finale.

Casting
Elisabeth Harnois' promotion to series regular was announced in April 2011, following a single-episode guest appearance during the show's eleventh season. Harnois joined the main cast during the season 12 premiere, "73 Seconds".

Character background
The daughter of Conrad Ecklie, Morgan was brought up with her mother and step-father (whose name she later adopted) in Los Angeles. Although she had little contact with her father following her parents' divorce, Brody also became a Crime Scene Investigator, working for the SID in Los Angeles. Upon coming into contact with the Las Vegas team, it is revealed that, as a child, Morgan spent time with Catherine Willows.

Storylines

Season 11 
During her debut appearance, Morgan works with the CSIs to track Nate Haskell, an escaped serial killer, in Los Angeles. The take-down of Haskell had effects for both the LVPD and the LAPD, and it is insinuated that Brody was fired from the Crime Lab for involvement in the case.

Season 12 
Brody travels to Las Vegas in the season twelve premiere, "73 Seconds", in order to ask her father for a position within the Las Vegas Crime Lab. In "Bittersweet"; however, Morgan tells Greg that she is not interested in dating guys on the job, despite the flirtatious nature of their relationship. Later, in "CSI Down", Morgan is abducted on a rescue helicopter.

Season 13 
Her father gets shot and while in the hospital awaiting her dad's news, she kisses David Hodges.

Season 14 
In the season 14 premiere, Morgan is kidnapped and later is shot in the back by Ellie Brass.

Season 15

Immortality

References

CSI: Crime Scene Investigation characters
Fictional female scientists
Fictional forensic scientists
Fictional Las Vegas Police Department detectives
Fictional Los Angeles Police Department detectives
Television characters introduced in 2011